Lewinia is a genus of birds in the family Rallidae.

The genus was erected by the English zoologist George Robert Gray in 1855 with Lewin's rail Lewinia pectoralis as the type species. The genus name is from a synonym of the type species Rallus lewinii Swainson, 1837. The common name commemorates the English engraver and naturalist John Lewin (1770–1819) who settled in Australia.

Species
The genus contains the following four species:

References

 
Rallidae
Bird genera
Taxa named by George Robert Gray
Taxonomy articles created by Polbot